Ross is an unincorporated community in Dieter Township, Roseau County, Minnesota, United States.

The community is located northwest of Roseau near the junction of State Highway 89 (MN 89) and Roseau County Road 10 (350th Street).

Nearby places include Roseau, Badger, Pinecreek, Fox, and Ross Township.  The Roseau River flows through the community.

References

Unincorporated communities in Minnesota
Unincorporated communities in Roseau County, Minnesota